Ezio Bartalini (24 June 1884 - 17 December 1962) was an Italian politician.

Bartalini was born in Monte San Savino. He represented the Italian Socialist Party in the Constituent Assembly of Italy from 1947 to 1948.

References

1884 births
1962 deaths
People from Monte San Savino
Italian Socialist Party politicians
Members of the Constituent Assembly of Italy
Politicians of Tuscany